Jäger, Jager, or Jaeger, meaning "hunter" in German, may refer to:

Jäger (surname), shared by many people

Fictional characters
 Frank Jaeger, better known as Gray Fox, in the Metal Gear series
 Eren Jaeger, or Eren Yeager, protagonist in the Attack on Titan manga and anime
 Felix Jaeger, in the Gotrek and Felix series
Gen. Radi Jaeger, a villain in the video game Valkyria Chronicles - see List of Valkyria Chronicles characters
Jaeger, a member of the Teknos faction in the video game The Unholy War
Jaeger, in the television series Altered Carbon
Jaeger, a group of vampire hunters in the anime series Sirius the Jaeger
Jaegers, a group in the Akame ga Kill! manga and anime
Jaegers, piloted robots used to fight alien monsters in the 2013 film Pacific Rim and the 2018 sequel
Jäger, a member of the GSG-9 in the video game Rainbow Six Siege

In biology
Jaeger, the North American name for the smaller species of the skua family of seabirds
Jaeger 70, a hybrid of two American species of grape
Jaeger's anetia, a species of butterfly in the family Danaidae

Businesses and products
Jaeger (automobile), an automobile built in Belleville, Michigan by the Jaeger Motor Car Company
Jaeger (clothing), a United Kingdom clothing retailer, named after Gustav Jäger
Jaeger, a union suit (or "woolly combination") popularised by the Jaeger clothing company
Jaeger (software), a distributed tracing system
Jaeger, a trademark of Italian automotive manufacturer Magneti Marelli
Armi Jager, an Italian firearms manufacturer
Eheim, a German company that makes aquarium heaters under the name Jäger

Military
Jäger (infantry), a German military term for rifle-armed infantry
Jäger rifle, a type of early flintlock rifle; see German military rifles

In sport
Hunter Jaegers, an Australian netball team
Jäger (or Jaeger), a release skill performed on the horizontal bar or uneven bars in gymnastics
Rote Jäger, a short-lived German military football club active during World War II

Other uses
 Jager, an alternative name for the city of Eger in Hungary

See also 
 De Jager
 Jaeger-LeCoultre, a maker of watches
 Yeager
 Jagger (disambiguation)
Jágr (surname)